Märjelensee is a lake in the canton of Valais, Switzerland. It formed on the eastern side of the Aletsch Glacier in the 19th century.

External links

Lakes of Valais